Cengong County, which was called  (思州) in ancient times, is a county of eastern Guizhou province, China. It is under the administration of the Qiandongnan Miao and Dong Autonomous Prefecture.

Climate

References

County-level divisions of Guizhou
Counties of Qiandongnan Prefecture